Cooking? Cooking!, is the first EP by South Korean boy band Super Junior-H, sub-unit of Super Junior. It was released on 5 June 2008 by SM Entertainment. The mini album sold close to 2,000 copies within one day of release. It was also released in Taiwan by Avex Taiwan on 11 July 2008.

Overview
Super Junior-H is Super Junior's fourth official sub-unit after Super Junior-K.R.Y, Super Junior-T, and Super Junior-M. They debuted on 7 June 2008 with the performance of their first promotional dance single, "Cooking? Cooking!", at the 2008 Dream Concert. Their EP contains a total of five tracks, all of which display exhilarating music with cheerful dances, bringing happiness to listeners. Bubbly and blissful with playful and chatty lyrics, the title track "Cooking? Cooking!" is widely known to be reserved as the "Best Summer Song of the Year" by SM Entertainment. The lyrics deal of a fun episode that took place while eating the food a girlfriend cooked. Other tracks, such as "Pajama Party", "You&I", and "Sunny" are other samples of the same bubbly genre, however, each song differ in style because of the unique sounds that are incorporated into each different track. "You&I" is influenced by modern jazz/swing music while "Sunny" is an influence from retro, disco dance. The last track, "Good Luck!!" is a medium-tempo ballad with vocal harmonization, which also includes a brief a cappella performance by the members.

The EP's jacket photoshoots are also included in the album, compressing them into a 28-page long booklet. The themes of the photoshoots contain a variety of different themes, such as a fun pajama party, a pillow fight, and a cooking party.

Track listing

Charts

Monthly album sales (South Korea)
Derived from both offline and online sales.

Chart positions

South Korea

References

External links
SM Entertainment's Official Site
Super Junior-Happy's Official Site

2008 EPs
SM Entertainment EPs
Korean-language EPs